The Belitung shipwreck (also called the Tang shipwreck or Batu Hitam shipwreck) is the wreck of an Arabian dhow which sank around 830 AD. It is unclear why the ship was south of the typical route when it sank.

The wreck has given archaeologists two major discoveries: the biggest single collection of Tang dynasty artefacts found in one location outside of China, the so-called "Tang Treasure"; and the Arabian dhow, which gives a new insight into the trade routes between China and the Middle East during that period. The treasure has been kept as one collection and, during the excavation, the efforts to preserve the integrity of the site and its cargo have resulted in detailed archaeological evidence. This evidence has given new insight into the construction methods used in shipbuilding, and the items and style of artefacts has revealed previously unknown facts about the trade between the two areas.

At the present, the Tang dynasty treasures recovered from the Belitung shipwreck are located in a permanent exhibition in the Asian Civilisations Museum in Singapore under the name "Tang Shipwreck".

Discovery and route

Discovery
The site location was purchased from local fishermen and a license to engage in excavation was awarded to a local Indonesian company. The dig was subsequently financed and excavated by Tilman Walterfang and his team at Seabed Explorations, under a license of co-operation with the original salvage company, and after a request from the Indonesian Government; security was provided by the Indonesian Navy. The excavations spanned two expeditions, one which commenced in August 1998 and the second in 1999. Seabed Explorations provided vessels and financed government naval operations to safeguard the wreck site before and during the monsoon season.

Route
It is unclear why the ship was so far from its expected route (shown in red on the map to the right), as most ships leaving China for Arabia would have sailed through the South China Sea. They would then turn north-west after passing southern Vietnam, continuing through the Singapore Strait into the Straits of Malacca between Peninsular Malaysia and Sumatra. Belitung is some distance from this route, and it is unclear how the vessel came to be in this area.

Ship and construction

The wreck timbers were found under a sediment that preserved the remains of the wooden vessel, without which the wreck would have been lost due to marine worms. Wrecks of this age are rare finds and this particular one was in such a good condition that much of the hull was preserved. This has given insight into how ships of this period were constructed—something which has not been seen before as no Arabian ship of this type had previously been found, nor any with their cargo intact.

Pieces of the original timbers were preserved enough to allow scientists to analyse them and determine some of the types of wood used. It is possible that the ship was constructed in western Asia and bought by Arabian merchants to be used for the Oman to China route; the cargo contains many Arabian-inspired artefacts.

Construction techniques

The front of the ship had a 61° angle of rake at the bow where the stem post was joined to the keel with mortise and tenon joints and secured with  diameter rope. The hull planks were stitched onto the frames and keel through holes spaced at  intervals. The boat had a keelson for added strength, which rested on the half-frames.

Michael Flecker, the chief excavating archaeologist at the site, compared the wrecked ship to three types of the same period and concluded that the wreck most resembled "lashed-lug" ships of Austronesian peoples in Maritime Southeast Asia, the oldest known examples of which are the Pontian boat of Pahang, Malaysia (c.260-430 CE) and the balangay boat burials of Butuan, Philippines (c.320-1250 CE). He said that fully stitched boats were found from the African coast, Oman, in the Red Sea, on the Indian coast, and as far as the Maldives. He notes that Roman references by Procopius in the 6th century tell of boats with planks stitched together in a similar fashion used in "Indian Seas". Though Arabian ships of this type have not been found before, they are mentioned in text including the late-Tang  ("Strange Things Noted in the South"). According to John Guy, curator of the Metropolitan Museum of Art, the book "describes the ships of foreign merchants as being stitched together with the fiber of coir-palms and having their seams caulked rather than using iron nails to secure their planks".

Wood types
Samples of wood from the shipwreck were sent for analysis at the Forest and Forest Products division of the Commonwealth Scientific and Industrial Research Organisation (CSIRO) in Australia. The analysis was conducted by Jugo Ilic of CSIRO, a wood identification specialist. Many of the samples were too badly deteriorated to be positively identified, as the lack of cellulose remaining in the wood cells prevented successful analysis.

Many types of wood have been positively identified: teak (Tectona grandis) was used for the through-beams and is resilient to the teredo worm (of the family Teredinidae), the ceiling was made from a genus Cupressus tree which was possibly Cupressus torulosa, the stem-post is made of rosewood from the family Leguminosae (now called the Fabaceae) and either the genus Dalbergia or Pterocarpus. The wooden box found in the stern area of the shipwreck was made from the genus Artocarpus of the mulberry family, Moraceae.

The species used for the hull planks was not positively identified but is thought to be Amoora of the family Meliaceae. The timber for the frames was similarly not definitively determined, although one frame was probably of Amoora or of the genus Afzelia of the family Fabaceae. Afzelia is interesting in that the three main species A. africana, A. bipindensis and A. pachyloba are mostly found in a small part of Africa, stretching from the mid-western coast in a thin band towards the east coast and stopping short of it by a couple of hundred miles.

The ship could originally have been said to be of Arabian or Indian origin, as there is little to differentiate between ships of the area during that period, in regard to construction techniques—though its frame uses a species of tree that is only found in a small part of Africa. After analysing the hull form, timber species, and construction methods, Ilic concluded that the wreck was of Indian or Arabian origin. India was considered the more probable place of construction but Arabian construction was not ruled out, as the timber used was commonly imported to the Middle East for use in shipbuilding. Flecker concluded that the wreck was an Arabian ship in his 2010 chapter from the Sackler exhibition catalogue, arguing that "from an analysis of construction methods and materials and hull form, the author has determined that the Belitung wreck is an Arab vessel."

Legacy
Present-day knowledge of the original materials and methods used in construction of this particular Arab dhow stems largely from the shipwreck itself. The Jewel of Muscat reconstruction, a replica made as an exact copy of the wreck, has shown that the ship resembles a baitl qarib, a type of ship still found in Oman today. Amongst the hull of the shipwreck were large lumps of concretion containing artefacts from the ship's cargo dated to the Tang dynasty of China around 800 AD, and from where the wreck gets its other names, the "Tang shipwreck" or "Tang treasure ship".

The ship's timbers and artefacts were shown to the public for the first time in 2011. The world debut exhibition of the collection of artefacts, as well as timbers from the ship, took place in the ArtScience Museum, adjacent to Singapore's Marina Bay Sands. The significance of the discovery of the shipwreck led to the decision to construct the Jewel of Muscat as an exact reconstruction of the shipwrecked dhow.

Cargo and "Tang treasure"

The wreck held three main types of Chinese "wares" in the form of bowls: Changsha ware (produced in kilns in Tongguan), the majority of the 60,000 items, were originally packed in either straw cylinders or "Dusun" storage jars; White-ware, manufactured in the Ding kilns and including the earliest known intact underglaze blue and white dishes; and Yue ware from Zhejiang Province. One Changsha bowl was inscribed with a date: "16th day of the seventh month of the second year of the Baoli reign", or 826 AD. This was later confirmed by radiocarbon dating of star anise found amongst the wreck. The cargo had a variety of influences and markets, including Buddhist lotus symbols, motifs from Central Asia and Persia, Koranic inscriptions, and green-splashed bowls popular in Iran.

Included in the cargo were items of varying purposes, from spice jars (martaban) and ewers to inkwells, funeral urns and gilt-silver boxes. The cargo was described by John Guy of the Metropolitan Museum of Art in New York as "the richest and largest consignment of early ninth-century southern Chinese gold and ceramics ever discovered in a single hoard." The cargo also included spices and resin, and metal ingots used as ballast. There were also special items found which include a gold cup—the largest Tang dynasty gold cup ever found—and a large silver flask decorated with a pair of ducks. The gold cup has pictures of people in various actions on its sides, such as musicians and a Persian dancer. It also has images of two men on its thumb plate with features that appear to be non-Chinese, as they are depicted with curly hair.

Current disposition
Tilman Walterfang's company formed a contract of cooperation with the original Indonesian salvage company and as a result the cargo was not sold off piece by piece to collectors. Although there were instances of some looting from the site, particularly between the two excavation periods, Walterfang kept the cargo intact as one complete collection so that it could be studied in its original context; something which has given an "unparalleled insight into China's industrial capacity and global trade" according to Julian Raby, director of the Arthur M. Sackler Gallery. It was housed in a private conservation facility for six years, where the artefacts were painstakingly conserved (including desalination), studied, and carefully restored by Walterfang's company, Seabed Explorations Ltd of New Zealand. The work was carried out with the assistance of German conservator Andreas Rettel, who trained at the Römisch-Germanisches Zentralmuseum in Mainz. The artefacts were authenticated by Professor Geng Baochang, a senior research fellow at the Palace Museum in Beijing. Geng is the deputy director of Beijing's Forbidden City and one of China's foremost experts on antique ceramics.

The cargo was purchased for around 32 million USD by a private company, the Sentosa Leisure Group (now the Sentosa Development Corporation), and the Singaporean government in 2005, and loaned to the Singapore Tourism Board.

The debut exhibit of the treasure ran from 19 February 2011 to 31 July 2011 at the ArtScience Museum in Singapore. The display was put on with the collaboration of the Smithsonian Institution, The Freer Gallery of Art, the Arthur M. Sackler Gallery, the Singapore Tourism Board, and the National Heritage Board of Singapore. The exhibition was then scheduled to travel the world for approximately five years, to venues which include museums of major importance throughout Asia, Australia, Europe, the Middle East, and the United States. In 2017, co-organised by Asia Society and the Asian Civilisations Museum, some pieces from the shipwreck were exhibited at Secrets of the Sea: A Tang Shipwreck and Early Trade in Asia which took place at Asia Society and Museum in New York from March 7 to June 4.

In April 2015, it was announced that the Asian Civilisations Museum would house the Tang Shipwreck collection. The treasure has now found a permanent home, as the Tang Shipwreck, in the Khoo Teck Puat Gallery of the Asian Civilisations Museum, in Singapore.

Controversy
The Sackler Gallery, part of the Smithsonian Institution, was due to host the US premiere exhibition of the Belitung cargo in early 2012—a date set to coincide with the Smithsonian museum's 25th anniversary celebration. On 28 June 2011 it was reported that the museum was postponing the show. The Sackler Gallery has received condemnation of the exhibition due to the time-frame and nature of the original excavation of the artefacts; with arguments put forwards about whether the display should be allowed. According to The New York Times, "a group of archaeologists and anthropologists from the National Academy of Sciences — including Robert McCormick Adams, a former leader of the Smithsonian" wrote to the head of the Smithsonian Institution, G. Wayne Clough, on 5 April 2011 claiming that "proceeding with the exhibition would 'severely damage the stature and reputation' of the institution." Proponents of the arguments against display say that the excavation was for commercial gain and conducted so quickly as to have caused a loss of information pertaining to the crew and cargo. The New York Times article goes on to say that further comments were made by "the Society for American Archaeology, the Council of American Maritime Museums and the International Committee for Underwater Cultural Heritage, as well as groups within the Smithsonian, including the members of the anthropology department and the Senate of Scientists at its National Museum of Natural History" all asking that the Smithsonian reconsider the exhibition. There are also claims that exhibiting the artefacts would be against international agreements on underwater excavations. Kimberly L. Faulk, a marine archaeologist and vice chairwoman of the non-governmental Advisory Council on Underwater Archaeology said that, "by proceeding with the exhibition the Smithsonian — which is a research institution as well as a network of museums — would be violating its own set of professional ethics and promoting the looting of archaeological sites."

Proponents of the arguments to display the works claim that the excavation was indeed legal as the work was carried out in accordance with Indonesian law, at the request of the Indonesian government, and in accordance with international laws at the time. James P. Delgado, director of maritime heritage at the United States Department of Commerce National Oceanic and Atmospheric Administration, said that "allowing any of the finds from an excavation to be sold betrays the most basic aspects of research" with the New York Times going on to report that, "he [Delgado] wished the Belitung shipwreck had been academically excavated. But unlike some of his colleagues, he said that instead of canceling the exhibition, the Smithsonian could use it to educate the public about the consequences of the commercialization of underwater heritage."

Walterfang has stated that "the overall situation would without doubt be described as 'less than ideal'" and that "the Indonesian government, fearful of looting, ordered Seabed Explorations to begin an immediate round-the-clock recovery operation."

Some academics have expressed more definitive support for Tilman Walterfang’s excavation and treatment of the Belitung vessel and cargo.

Lu Caixia, a researcher at the Institute of Southeast Asian Studies in Singapore, states in the newsletter of the International Institute for Asian Studies, Leiden, Netherlands, that “the excavation of the Belitung has been acknowledged as an admirable example of what can be achieved under difficult conditions in Southeast Asia.” She points out that unlike some other commercial operators, Walterfang’s company ensured that “the ship structure itself was properly recorded, the cargo was kept together rather than dispersed, and the finds were well conserved, studied, catalogued, and published." Lu ends by highlighting the efficacy of the public-private arrangement: “It is difficult to imagine how this particular project could have been financed or organized without commercial involvement.” 

Prof. Victor H. Mair, Professor of Chinese Language and Literature in the Department of East Asian Languages and Civilizations at the University of Pennsylvania, Philadelphia, United States defends the Smithsonian exhibition, claiming that the “educational and historical value of the collection is simply enormous, and those who have called for the cancellation of the exhibition are, in effect and in fact, denying access to the wealth of information embodied in the Belitung shipwreck, both to the lay public and to qualified researchers."

Dr. Sean Kingsley, Director of Wreck Watch International reminds that "Wrecks like these should be ‘feel good’ factors at times when the world has very serious and painful natural, economic and civil disasters to contend with" and "it hardly needs stating that no European and American museum collection is whiter than white."

In an interview with the Science Journal G. Wayne Clough, the 12th secretary of the Smithsonian Institution assuaged  the animosities between critics and proponents of the exhibition:  “So I don't think there's anything negative here. I think the Smithsonian tried to do it right. When we heard the concerns, we asked the community to come together and talk about it, and we listened, and some people in that audience had their minds changed, as a matter of fact, but not everybody. So, I think it's time in a situation like this to pause, and for the profession itself to say, "Okay, there's a problem, what are you going to do about it? And, you remember, the United States never signed the UNESCO treaty.”

Conventions by international organisations
The Underwater Archaeology Resolutions that were adopted on 10 September 1993 by the International Congress of Maritime Museums (ICMM) state that:

They also say that, "ICMM members should recognize that artefacts from underwater sites are integral parts of archaeological assemblages, which should remain intact for research and display" and that, "a commercially exploited heritage site is one in which the primary motive for investigation is private financial gain." The United Nations Educational, Scientific and Cultural Organization (UNESCO) ratified a set of rules for preserving and excavating underwater sites at the Convention on the Protection of the Underwater Cultural Heritage during 15 October — 5 November 2001. Though the rules set out at the meeting do include preserving artefacts in situ as the preferable option they go on to say:

See also
Cirebon shipwreck, also contains large cargo of Chinese wares
ArtScience Museum
Jewel of Muscat
Belitung

Notes

References

External links

A photograph of the Jewel of Muscat, housed in the ArtScience Museum
ArtScience Museum website
Seabed Explorations website
Tilman Walterfang Manifesto
From Beneath, A Smithsonian Shipwreck Controversy, NPR
Story about ship's discovery, The Independent

830s
9th-century artifacts
1998 archaeological discoveries
Tang dynasty
Shipwrecks of Indonesia
Shipwrecks in the Indian Ocean